The Italia Conti Academy of Theatre Arts is a performing arts conservatoire based in Woking, England. It was founded in 1911 by Italia Conti, an actress. The first production at Italia Conti Academy was the play Where the Rainbow Ends. For that play, Italia Conti was asked to take over the job of training the cast.

The academy then moved to a church building in Lamb's Conduit Street (at #14). However, during World War II, the academy was bombed, destroying all early records. In 1972, the academy relocated to a building in Landor Road, Clapham. It was the home to all full-time Italia Conti pupils for nine years.

In 1981, the academy started running Junior and Musical Theatre courses in Islington. The BA (Hons) Acting and CertHe Intro to Acting courses continued to be delivered from the Avondale site in Clapham. In August 2011, all courses moved to Woking. Italia Conti is a member of the Federation of Drama Schools and accredited by the Council for Dance, Drama and Musical Theatre.

Courses

BA (Hons) Acting
The BA (Hons) Acting Course, validated by the University of East London and accredited by the Federation of Drama Schools. It is a three-year full-time professional actor's training for students over the age of 18. It is based in the newly build Italia Conti building in Woking, Surrey. The  course is run by Bradley Leech (Head of School of Acting), with staff and directors including Kate Williams, Paulette Randall, Karen Henthorn, Dugald Bruce-Lockhart, Lawrence Evans, John Gillett and Anna Jordan. Graduates of this programme include Karla Crome, Mark Ebulué, Jess Ellis, Karen Gillan, Aisling Jarrett-Gavin, Matt Lapinskas, Carla Langley, Bethany Muir, James Nelson-Joyce, Racheal Ofori, Gemma Salter, Lucie Shorthouse, Fiona Skinner, Gary Trainor, Nina Toussaint-White and Dwane Walcott.

CertHE Introduction to Acting
The CertHE Intro to Acting Programme, validated by the University of East London, is a one-year full-time preparation and foundation training for students aged 18+ who wish to explore an actor-training, or vocational courses within a performance-related field. The course operates alongside the BA (Hons) Acting Course in Italia Conti's Woking building, and was previously known as the Foundation Acting Course.

BA (Hons) Musical Theatre 
The BA (Hons) Musical Theatre Course, validated by the University of East London, is a three-year full-time professional musical theatre training for students above the age of 18. The first intake of students for this programme was in 2018.

CertHE Musical Theatre Performance 
Following the success of the CertHE Introduction to Acting course, the School for Musical Theatre & Dance validated a similar foundation course for Musical Theatre. The first student enrollment process for this course took place in 2021. It is a one-year full-time preparation and foundation training for students above the age of 18.

Diploma - Professional Musical Theatre
The Professional Musical Theatre Course is a three-year full-time course for students from the age of 16; validated by Trinity College London. It is designed for students who require an all-round training in performing arts. The emphasis is on training in the three main art forms; acting, singing and dancing.

Diploma - Professional Dance
The Professional Dance Course is a three-year full-time course for students from the age of 16; validated by Trinity College London.  It is designed to provide students with a comprehensive training in all aspects of dance.

BA (Hons) Professional Arts Practice (Top Up) 
Recognising the gap for students who had previous matriculated with a Diploma within the performing arts, but were without a HE degree, Italia Conti developed a course designed to be completed entirely through distance learning that would allow students to 'top up' from a Level 5 or Level 6 non degree qualification to a BA (Hons). The first intake of students for this course was January 2022.

BA (Hons) Dance 
Newly validated in 2022.

CertHE Introduction to Dance 
Newly validated in 2022.

MA/MFA Teaching & Coaching: The Spoken Word 
Newly validated in 2022 and Italia Conti's first post-graduate course.

Previous Courses (no longer running)

Performing Arts with Dance Teacher Training 
The Performing Arts with Dance Teacher Training is a three-year full-time course for students from the age of 16 and takes place at the Italia Conti Arts Centre. The course trains students to become performers and dance teachers by providing performing arts training and dance teaching qualifications. With the introduction of the ISTD (Imperial Society of Teachers of Dancing) qualifications in 2006, the academy provided students with the opportunity to take these examinations. The course follows the same path as the Performing Arts Course but also incorporates the teacher training by offering the FDI (Foundation in Dance Instruction) qualifications in classical ballet, tap and modern dance. This allows students to become qualified dance teachers to teach up to grade 5 in the ISTD syllabus. Aspects of the course include Dance, Acting, Singing, Contextual Studies and Additional Content such as ISTD examinations, PGCE work, latin dance, music, performance, pilates, presentation and professional skills, stage combat, video production and theatre in education production.

Theatre Arts School 
The Theatre Arts School, also known as the ‘Juniors’, was a co-educational independent school for pupils aged from 10 to 16 years old. The Theatre Arts School  was located firstly in the Avondale building in Clapham, London and then in then at Goswell House, Barbican, London. The school was accredited by the Independent Schools Council and monitored by the Independent Schools Inspectorate. Pupils would follow an academic curriculum to ensure they graduated with qualifications whilst also studying a range of performance skills. In May 2020, during the Covid-19 pandemic, it was announced that the Theatre Arts school would close in the summer of 2021 after 109 years.

Buildings and facilities

Woking, Surrey (New Building) 
In August 2022 Italia Conti moved to a new bespoke-built facility in Woking, Surrey. This facility brings together the School of Acting, which was previously delivered from the Avondale Building in Clapham North, London, and the School of Musical Theatre & Dance which was split between Barbican, London, and Guildford, Surrey sites.

Previous homes

The Academy 
'Italia Conti House', commonly referred to as 'The Academy', was based in a former office block in Goswell Road, Islington, London. It was home to the Musical Theatre BA (Hons), Diploma courses and Dance Diploma Course. The Goswell Road campus also housed the Theatre Arts school until it closed in 2020. The building was set over nine floors and had 18 dance, acting and singing studios, equipped with sprung floors, full length mirrors, ballet barres and sound systems. Italia Conti House had lecture rooms, academic school rooms, specialist classrooms, an art room, a video studio and editing suite, an IT suite, a resource library, first aid and treatment room, dressing room, student common room and a canteen.

Avondale 
The BA (Hons) Acting and CertHE Intro to Acting courses were based in the 'Avondale' building, in Clapham, London. The impressive Edwardian building was originally the home of all courses before the Theatre Arts School and Musical Theatre courses moved to Goswell Road. The building featured the Avondale Theatre and Sheridan Studio Theatre, six acting and movement studios, a fully equipped recording studio, a sound studio, a TV edit studio, green room, IT facilities, a library, property store rooms, dressing rooms and student social spaces.

Italia Conti Arts Centre 
The Italia Conti Arts Centre was based in Guildford and housed the degree and diploma Musical Theatre courses as well as the Performing Arts with Dance Teacher Training Course. The Arts Centre had seven air-conditioned studios with sprung floor and mirrors. Other facilities at the Arts Centre include a dance wear shop, a recording and video studio with editing suite, a class room, lounge and cafeteria area, student common rooms and changing rooms. The building continues to be the base for Italia Conti Associates Guildford.

Italia Conti Associates 
The Italia Conti Associate Schools offer a wide range of classes, providing students with the opportunity to receive a full and thorough training and learn a wide range of performance skills.

Listed below are the locations of associate school branches which take place around the country and provide courses in part-time performing arts training:
 Italia Conti Associates Battersea, London
 Italia Conti Associates Bishop's Stortford
 Italia Conti Associates Brighton & Hove
 Italia Conti Associates Chislehurst at Coopers School, Chislehurst, London
 Italia Conti Associates Guildford, Surrey 
 Italia Conti Associates Newbury at St Bartholomew's School, Newbury, Berkshire
 Italia Conti Associates Newcastle
 Italia Conti Associates Petersfield
 Italia Conti Associates Plymouth at Lipson Co-operative Academy, Plymouth, Devon
 Italia Conti Associates Reigate at Reigate School, Reigate, Surrey
 Italia Conti Associates Rugby
 Italia Conti Associates Ruislip
 Italia Conti Associates Tunbridge Wells at the Skinners School, Royal Tunbridge Wells, Kent
 Italia Conti Associates Woking at Italia Conti's main premises in Woking, Surrey

'School for Stars' 
A CBBC series following pupils at The Italia Conti Academy of Theatre Arts as they juggle the glamour and excitement of careers in TV, film and theatre with the highs and lows of school life. GCSE exams, tests, the school prom and End of Year School Performance. Each series followed a set of students during the school term. The series mainly featured the Theatre Arts School (Juniors) as well as occasionally featuring students from the various 16+ courses. School For Stars first aired in 2011 and a third series began on 2 September 2013. The show is narrated by Reggie Yates.

Alumni

In literature
The Italia Conti Academy was the inspiration for the drama school in At Freddie's, a novel by Penelope Fitzgerald, who taught at the academy in the 1960s.

References

Educational institutions established in 1911
Schools of the performing arts in the United Kingdom
Dance schools in the United Kingdom
Drama schools in London
1911 establishments in England